The Honourific Title of Merit is a decoration of Macau established in 2001 in recognition of individuals who have contributed significantly to the Macau Special Administrative Region of the People's Republic of China.

List of Winners

References 

Orders, decorations, and medals of Macau